The Redstone River is a river in the James Bay drainage basin in Cochrane, Timiskaming and Sudbury Districts in northeastern Ontario, Canada. It flows  from Semple Lake to its mouth at Night Hawk Lake, the source of the Frederick House River.

Course
It flows southeast to Redstone Lake, then heads northeast through the northwest strip of the Unorganized West Part of Timiskaming District and onward into the city of Timmins in Cochrane District. The lake empties via the Frederick House River, the Abitibi River and the Moose River to James Bay.

Tributaries
Croteau Creek (right)
Shaw Creek (left)
Kennedy Creek (left)
Geikie Creek (right)
Ferrier Creek (left)

See also
List of rivers of Ontario

References

Rivers of Cochrane District
Rivers of Sudbury District
Rivers of Timiskaming District